Ishkhanik ruler of Hereti between 943–951. He was the son and successor of Adarnase Patrikios, ruled together with his mother Queen regnant Dinar, sister of Grand Magister Gurgen IV, Prince of Klarjeti ( 918–941).

Under Ishkhanik's reign Hereti was forced to recognize the supremacy of the stronger neighbour, Principality of Daylam, ruled by the Sallarid dynasty (Iranian Azerbaijan). According to The Georgian Chronicles Queen Dinar, along with her son Ishkhanik converted Hereti to the Eastern Orthodox confession and abandoned the Oriental Orthodox confession in the 10th century. In 950, he took advantage of the bitter power struggle in the Sallarid state, and ceased to pay tribute effectively restoring his independence. Ishkhanik recovered his authority over several fortresses in Kakheti, the latter was weakened after the devastating Sajid invasion.

References

Sources 
 Papuashvili T. (1970), Problems of the history of Hereti, Tbilisi
 Papuashvili T., Georgian Soviet Encyclopedia, V, p. 288, Tbilisi, 1980

Monarchs of Hereti
951 deaths
Year of birth unknown
10th-century people from Georgia (country)